Percy Ellis was an English footballer who played for Walsall, Port Vale, and Stafford Rangers.

Career
Ellis played Walsall before joining Port Vale in the summer of 1919. He made his debut in a 2–0 defeat at South Shields on 18 October, and played a further eleven Second Division and three Staffordshire Senior Cup games that season. He was released in May 1921, having not played a first team game at The Old Recreation Ground in the 1920–21 campaign. He returned to Walsall and later moved on to Stafford Rangers.

Career statistics
Source:

References

Sportspeople from Hanley, Staffordshire
English footballers
Association football fullbacks
Walsall F.C. players
Port Vale F.C. players
Stafford Rangers F.C. players
English Football League players
Year of birth missing
Year of death missing